

Portugal
 Angola – 
 José de Almeida e Vasconcellos de Soveral e Carvalho, Governor of Angola (1784–1790)
 Manuel de Almeida e Vasconcelos, Governor of Angola (1790–1797)
 Macau –
 Lazaro da Silva Ferreira, Governor of Macau (1789–1790)
 Manuel Antonio Costa Ferreira, Military Commander (1789–1790)
 D. Vasco Luis Carneiro de Sousa e Faro, Governor of Macau (1790–1793)

Spain
 Oran – 
Manuel Pineda de la Torre y Solís, marqués de Campo Santo, Governor of Oran (1789–1790)
Joaquín Mayone y Ferrari, conde de Cumbre Hermosa, Governor of Oran (1790–1791)

Kingdom of Great Britain
 New South Wales – Arthur Phillip, Governor of New South Wales (1788–1792)

Colonial governors
Colonial governors
1790